USS Otsego was a steamer acquired by the Union Navy during the American Civil War. She was used by the Navy to patrol navigable waterways of the Confederacy to prevent the South from trading with other countries.

Service history

Otsego, a wooden, double-ended, side-wheel gunboat, was launched 31 March 1863 by Jacob A. & D. D. Westervelt, New York City, New York, and apparently commissioned in the spring of 1864, Commander John P. Bankhead in command . Assigned to the North Atlantic Blockading Squadron 2 May 1864, Otsego reached Hampton Roads, Virginia, on the 24th, and got underway on 12 June for New Berne, North Carolina, and served in the North Carolina Sounds where she served throughout her career, helping tighten the Union grip on these strategic waters and adjoining territory, primarily guarding the mouth of the Roanoke River against an attack by Confederate ironclad ram CSS Albemarle.

When Lt. Cushing returned from his bold raid which destroyed the dreaded Southern ram on the night of 27–28 October, Otsego, in a group of Union ships under Comdr. Macomb ascended the Roanoke River and attacked Plymouth, North Carolina forcing it to surrender after a bitter fight, 1 November. The Federal forces took 37 prisoners, 22 cannon, vast stores, 200 stands of arms, and the hulk of sunken but still important Albemarle. For more than a month thereafter, Otsego performed reconnaissance and mop up work up the Roanoke River. On 9 December she struck two torpedoes (mines) in quick succession and sank in that river near Jamesville, North Carolina.

References

External links 
 Photo gallery at Naval Historical Center

 

 

Ships of the Union Navy
Ships built in New York City
Ships built by Westervelt & MacKay
Sassacus-class gunboats
Steamships of the United States Navy
American Civil War patrol vessels of the United States
1863 ships
Shipwrecks of the American Civil War
Ships sunk by mines
Shipwrecks in rivers
Maritime incidents in December 1864